John Whittaker Taylor (May 15, 1858 – October 10, 1916) was a member of the Quorum of the Twelve Apostles of the Church of Jesus Christ of Latter-day Saints (LDS Church) and was the son of John Taylor, the third president of the church. While he was an apostle, Taylor was excommunicated from the LDS Church for opposing the church's abandonment of plural marriage. He was subsequently posthumously re-baptized in 1965.

Family and occupation
John W. Taylor was born in Provo, Utah Territory, while his parents John Taylor and Sophia Whitaker were taking shelter there, along with other church members, during the Utah War. He married May Leona Rich (daughter of John Taylor Rich and Agnes Young) on October 19, 1882, and moved to Cassia County, Idaho, to ranch. As a practitioner of plural marriage, Taylor later married Nellie Todd, Janet Maria Wooley, Eliza Roxie Welling, Rhoda Welling, and Ellen Georgina Sandberg. He also worked as a county clerk and a newspaper editor.

Taylor's son Samuel W. Taylor became his biographer and a prolific writer of fiction and non-fiction.

Church service and conflict 
In the LDS Church, Taylor was ordained as a deacon around 1872 and as a teacher in 1874. He also served as missionary in the United States, Canada, and England. Taylor was asked to be an apostle and member of the Quorum of the Twelve Apostles of the church by his father. He was ordained on May 15, 1884, his 26th birthday.

Taylor was a staunch believer in the doctrine of plural marriage, and had six wives and 36 children. Although the church officially forbade new plural marriages with the 1890 Manifesto, Taylor continued to privately marry additional wives.  Under pressure, he submitted his resignation from the Quorum of the Twelve on October 28, 1905. Matthias F. Cowley also resigned from the Quorum at the same time over the plural marriage dispute. The following February, Marriner W. Merrill died. In the April General Conference of 1906, the resignations of Cowley and Taylor were presented to and accepted by the general church membership. As a result, three new apostles were called to replace them and Merrill: George F. Richards, Orson F. Whitney, and David O. McKay.

Taylor disputed with the Quorum of the Twelve often after his resignation. He was finally excommunicated on March 28, 1911 for continued opposition to the Second Manifesto.  However, he remained a believer in Mormonism up to his death. He died of stomach cancer at his home in Forest Dale, Salt Lake County, Utah, at age 58. He was buried at Salt Lake City Cemetery.

In August 1916, Taylor was posthumously baptized by proxy and reinstated into the church by two stake presidents. However, a year later, the First Presidency officially stated that the reinstatement was null and void. He was later officially rebaptized and on May 21, 1965, received the ordinance of Restoration of Blessings by proxy under the hands of Joseph Fielding Smith, President of the Quorum of the Twelve Apostles, with the unanimous approval of the First Presidency and Quorum of the Twelve Apostles.

Honors
The Taylor Stake of the LDS Church, which was headquartered in Raymond, Alberta, was named in Taylor's honor. As an apostle, Taylor had made considerable efforts to assist the Mormon settlers in Canada. The Taylor Stake was renamed the Raymond Alberta Stake in the 1970s.

In the 2000s, the town of Raymond built a street named Taylor Street in his honor. An LDS Church chapel was built on the street, and it is named the Taylor Street Chapel.

See also
Second Manifesto
1886 Revelation
The Church of Jesus Christ of Latter-day Saints in Canada
Reed Smoot hearings

Notes

References 
 Terrence C. Smith and Reed Turner (eds.) (2001). A Planting of the Lord : A Century of the Latter-day Saints in Raymond, 1901–2001 (Raymond, Alberta: Raymond Alberta Stake) 
 Samuel W. Taylor (1971). Family Kingdom (Salt Lake City, Utah: Zion Book Store)

External links 

 Grampa Bill's G.A. Pages: John W. Taylor

1858 births
1916 deaths
19th-century Mormon missionaries
American Mormon missionaries in Canada
American Mormon missionaries in England
American Mormon missionaries in the United States
American general authorities (LDS Church)
Apostles (LDS Church)
Burials at Salt Lake City Cemetery
Deaths from cancer in Utah
Deaths from stomach cancer
Latter Day Saints from Utah
Mormonism and polygamy
People excommunicated by the Church of Jesus Christ of Latter-day Saints
People from Provo, Utah
People from Salt Lake City
The Church of Jesus Christ of Latter-day Saints in Canada
Excommunicated general authorities (LDS Church)